Regina Isecke (5 January 1953 – 26 June 2015) was a German wheelchair tennis player who competed in international level events. She was known as a pioneer in wheelchair tennis in Germany and was the German Wheelchair Tennis Association's president for many years until her death.

Isecke was involved in an accident in 1971 resulting in a spinal cord injury and paraplegia, she was previously a wheelchair basketball player and a para table tennis player before switching to wheelchair tennis.

A street in Junkersdorf, Cologne is named after her, Regina-Isecke-Straße, in 2018.

References

External links
 
 

1953 births
2015 deaths
German female tennis players
Wheelchair tennis players
Paralympic wheelchair tennis players of Germany
Paralympic bronze medalists for Germany
Paralympic medalists in wheelchair tennis
Medalists at the 1992 Summer Paralympics
Wheelchair tennis players at the 1992 Summer Paralympics
Wheelchair tennis players at the 1996 Summer Paralympics
People from Pulheim
Sportspeople from Cologne (region)
Tennis people from North Rhine-Westphalia
20th-century German women